Events from the year 1978 in France.

Incumbents
 President: Valéry Giscard d'Estaing 
 Prime Minister: Raymond Barre

Events
February – Launch of the Horizon front-wheel drive hatchback by Chrysler Europe, which will be built in France as a Simca and sold in Britain as a Talbot.
1 February – Hollywood film director Roman Polanski skips bail and flees to France, after pleading guilty to charges of engaging in sex with a 13-year-old girl.
12 March – Legislative Election held.
19 March – Legislative Election held.
April – Launch of the Renault 18 saloon and estates, replacement for the Renault 12.
4 May – Communist activist Henri Curiel is murdered in Paris.
10 May – Two years after buying Citroën, carmaker Peugeot makes another takeover by purchasing the European operations of American car giant Chrysler, owners of the French Simca and British Chrysler brands.
16 May – Amoco Cadiz runs aground off the coast of Brittany, split in two and spilled  of oil.
18–19 May – Belgian and French paratroopers fly to Zaire to aid the fight against the rebels.
27 May – Brittany Ferries inaugurate a regular service between Roscoff and Cork in the Republic of Ireland.
26 June – Bombing by Breton nationalists causes destruction in Palace of Versailles.
December – The Simca Horizon is voted European Car of the Year.

Births

January to March
5 January – Franck Montagny, motor racing driver.
6 January – Renaud Dion, cyclist.
11 January – Stéphane Morisot, soccer player.
14 January – Éric Sitruk, soccer player.
17 January
 Stéphane Pasquier, jockey.
 Aboubacar Sankhare, soccer player.
21 January – David Coulibaly, soccer player.
30 January – Sébastien Sansoni, soccer player.
7 February – Nicolas Ardouin, soccer player.
8 February – Loïc Jean-Albert, parachuter.
11 February – Aurélien Cologni, rugby league player.
16 February – Nicolas Florentin, soccer player.
26 February – Stéphane Bonnes, soccer player.
5 March – Stéphane Martine, soccer player.
13 March – Faustine Merret, windsurfer and Olympic gold medallist.
22 March – Arnaud Le Lan, soccer player.
26 March – Cédric Mouret, soccer player.
27 March – Amélie Cocheteux, tennis player.
28 March – Fabien Audard, soccer player.
30 March – Édouard Cissé, soccer player.
31 March – Jérôme Rothen, international soccer player.

April to June
5 April – Boussad Houche, soccer player.
5 April – Arnaud Tournant, cyclist.
8 April – Mathieu Assou-Ekotto, soccer player.
11 April – David Ducourtioux, soccer player.
2 May – Didier Domi, soccer player.
5 May – Bruno Cheyrou, soccer player.
11 May – Laetitia Casta, supermodel and actress.
15 May – Sébastien Chabbert, soccer player.
15 May – Yohan Demont, soccer player.
27 May – Jacques Abardonado, soccer player.
29 May – Sébastien Grosjean, tennis player.
2 June – Nicolas Bal, Nordic combined skier and Olympic medallist.
6 June – Faudel, singer.
11 June – Julien Rodriguez, soccer player.
15 June – Jérôme Moïso, basketball player.
17 June – Isabelle Delobel, ice dancer.
17 June – Véronique Delobel, ice dancer.
23 June – Frédéric Leclercq, bassist.
28 June – Clarisse Albrecht, singer-songwriter, actress and former model

July to September
17 July – Émilie Simon, singer and composer.
18 July – Mélissa Theuriau, journalist and news anchor.
20 July – Cédric Heymans, rugby union player.
26 July – Matthieu Bataille, judoka.
28 July – Yannick Jauzion, rugby union player.
29 July – Julien Laharrague, rugby union player.
4 August – Emmanuelle Boidron, actress.
7 August – Alexandre Aja, film director.
9 August – Audrey Tautou, actress.
14 August – Pascal Delhommeau, soccer player.
19 August – François Modesto, soccer player.
19 August – Sebastien Tortelli, twice World Champion motocross racer.
27 August – Franck Queudrue, soccer player.
29 August – Yves Deroff, soccer player.
31 August – Philippe Christanval, soccer player.
9 September – Alioune Touré, soccer player.
11 September – Laurent Courtois, soccer player.
13 September – Sonia Huguet, cyclist.
20 September – Julien Bonnaire, rugby union player.
23 September – Frédéric Daquin, soccer player.
23 September – Ingrid Jacquemod, alpine skier.
27 September – Jean-Joël Perrier-Doumbé, soccer player.

October to December
5 October – Fabien Boudarène, soccer player.
29 October – Jérôme Guisset, rugby league player.
28 November – Denis Flahaut, cyclist.
November – Mélanie Doutey, actress.
7 December – Jean Bouilhou, rugby union player.
10 December – Grégory Proment, soccer player.
11 December – Eric Borel, spree killer (died 1995).
16 December – Sylvain Distin, soccer player.

Full date unknown
Valérie Crunchant, actress.
Damien Luce, pianist.

Deaths

January to June
8 January – André François-Poncet, politician and diplomat (born 1887).
16 January – Jean Gounot, gymnast and Olympic medallist (born 1894).
22 January – Léon Damas, poet and politician (born 1912).
24 January – Georges Perros, writer (born 1923).
31 January – Marie-Louise Damien, singer and actress (born 1889).
2 March – Alix Combelle, swing jazz tenor saxophonist, clarinetist and bandleader (born 1912).
11 March – Hélène Bouvier, operatic mezzo-soprano (born 1905).
11 March – Claude François, singer and songwriter (born 1939).
15 March – Jacques Forestier, rheumatologist (born 1890).
18 March – François Duprat, negationist writer (born 1941).
19 March – Gaston Julia, mathematician (born 1893).
20 March – Jacques Brugnon, tennis player (born 1895).
23 April – Jacques Rueff, economist and adviser to the French Government (born 1896).
4 May – Henri Curiel, political activist, assassinated (born 1914).
24 June – Robert Charroux, writer (born 1909).

July to December
14 July – Gaston Ragueneau, athlete and Olympic medallist (born 1881).
22 July – André Chapelon, mechanical engineer and designer of steam locomotives (born 1892).
23 July – Danielle Collobert, author, poet and journalist (born 1940).
26 August – Charles Boyer, actor (born 1899).
6 September – Max Décugis, tennis player (born 1882).
8 September – Jean Nicolas, international soccer player (born 1913).
19 September – Étienne Gilson, Thomistic philosopher and historian of philosophy (born 1884).
16 November – Claude Dauphin, actor (born 1903).
5 December – Bernard Faÿ, historian (born 1893).
21 December – Roger Caillois, writer and intellectual (born 1913).

Full date unknown
Georges Bénézé, philosopher (born 1888).
Henri Chapron, automobile coachbuilder (born 1886).
Robert Debré, pediatrician (born 1882).
Camille Le Mercier d'Erm, poet, historian and Breton nationalist (born 1888).

References

Links

1970s in France